Nautanki Saala! is a 2013 Indian Hindi-language  romantic comedy-drama film directed by Rohan Sippy, starring Ayushmann Khurrana and Kunaal Roy Kapur along with Pooja Salvi, Evelyn Sharma and Gaelyn Mendonca. The story is based upon the 2003 French comedy film Après Vous.

The film was produced by Ramesh Sippy, Bhushan Kumar, Krishan Kumar and Roopa de Choudhury under the banner of Super Cassettes Industries Ltd. in association with R.S. Entertainment. The first look of Nautanki Saala! was released on 2 October 2012. Ayshmann Khurrana has sung again in Nautanki Saala!. Upon release, Bhushan Kumar declared the movie as a "winner in all the aspects".

Abhishek Bachchan has done a cameo in the film for his friend, director Rohan Sippy. Bhushan Kumar finalised 12 April 2013 for Nautanki Saala!. He wanted a longer campaign of eight weeks for promotion. The first promo of Nautanki Saala! was attached with Special 26.

Plot
The story is about the friendship and the bonding between RP and Mandar and how they face problems and solve them.

Ram Parmar a.k.a. RP (Ayushmann Khurrana) is in meeting with a psychiatrist for problems he's experiencing due to three break-ups in last three months. The film runs in a narrative mode. RP is a successful theater artist portraying the role of Raavan. One day while returning home, he witnesses Mandar Lele (Kunaal Roy Kapur) attempting suicide. He saves him and brings home. Mandar is devastated because of his break-up with Nandini (Pooja Salvi) and attempted suicide because he thinks he is worthless. As Ram is a helping guy, he tries solving out Mandar's problems and probes into his life. He offers him the role of Lord Ram in his theater play. He finds Nandini and tries reuniting her with Mandar. While doing this he lies many times to his close friend Sita (Evelyn Sharma) and girlfriend Chitra (Gaelyn Mendonca). The latter ultimately breaks up with him. During this, Ram falls for Nandini who reciprocates his feelings. Meanwhile, Mandar is coming back to normal. Ram feels he is cheating his friend; he breaks-off with Nandini and makes arrangements so that Nandini and Mandar meet. Unfortunately, all this is revealed to Mandar and Nandini. Ram ultimately loses his girlfriend, his love and his friend.

Returning to the present day, the psychiatrist suggests RP to apologise to all three, which may suffice in resolving the problems. Mandar returns to RP's play in the role of Hanuman and unites Nandini with RP. After doing so, he lives with Sita.

Cast
 Ayushmann Khurrana as Ram Parmar a.k.a. R.P.
 Kunaal Roy Kapur as Mandar Lele
 Pooja Salvi as Nandini Patel (voice dubbed by Urvi Ashar)
 Gaelyn Mendonca as Chitra Singh
 Sanjeev Bhatt as Chandra
 Evelyn Sharma as Sita
 Rufy Khan as Loki
 Sulabha Arya as Mandar's grandmother
 Purva Naresh as Ram's psychiatrist
 Abhishek Bachchan in a Special Appearance

Production

Development
In early 2012, Bhushan Kumar and Rohan Sippy announced their first collaboration of working together to give out a romantic comedy film. Abhishek Bachchan, always a lucky mascot in Rohan Sippy's movies, announced that he would not be a part of the movie as the lead role. Bachchan Jr revealed that he has a cameo in this film. Later in June 2012, Rohan and Bhushan Kumar announced that the lead actors of the movie to be Ayushmann Khurrana (Vicky Donor fame) and Kunaal Roy Kapur (last seen in Delhi Belly).

The entire star cast of the movie is young and the leading female actors are also new. This will be Ayushmann's second movie after Vicky Donor. Prior to movies, he has been a VJ with a popular youth channel as well as an RJ in Chandigarh. Kunaal, on the other hand, was last seen in Delhi Belly.  The leading ladies of the movie are Pooja Salvi, Evelyn Sharma and Gaelyn Mandonca. Nautanki Saala! will be MTV VJ Gaelyn's and a number of television ads old model Pooja's debut, while it will be Evelyn's fifth Bollywood film to release.

Filming
The shoot went on floors on 22 July 2012 and the movie was entirely shot in Mumbai with major part of the movie being night sequences. The first look and announcement of the movie was made in October 2012 by T-Series productions

Soundtrack

The soundtrack for the film is romantic, lively and situational. Various music composers have made compositions in the album, including Falak, Mikey McCleary, Rashid Khan.

Post Khurana's successful singing debut in Vicky Donor, Bhushan Kumar and Rohan Sippy decided on making Khurana sing in this movie as well. Ayushmann has sung two songs in the movie that are romantic, youthful and connect well with the audience. After Paani Da Rang, Ayushmann Khurana captures the audience with his Saadi Galli Aaja and Tu Hi Tu in Nautanki Saala!

Bhushan Kumar gave the rights of "Dhak Dhak" (Beta) song to be reinvented the used in Nautanki Saala!. The song became an instant hit thus connecting highly with the audience and topping the music charts.

Song "So Gaya Yeh Jahan" is a remake version from Tezaab's Soundtrack

Reception

The soundtrack got a positive critical reception. Well-known music critic Sumit Sharma of Gomolo & DJMaza stated, "The soundtrack is truly noteworthy and a commixture of delightful melodies, sumptuous & scrumptious tracks and some Oaky Chartbusters. It's a Tuneful Soundtrack Of Musical Nautanki." and gave the album a rating of 4.5/5. Goku! of Indibeats!, gave the album a rating of 4/5 saying, "The composers have succeeded in bringing together some smart tracks so rich in melody and so varied in genres with immense repeat quality."

Release

Critical reception
The film received positive reviews from various critics praising the comedy of errors factor and lead actors performances. It got an aggregate review score of 3/5 from all sites at reviewbol.com. Sukanya Verma for Rediff.com has given 2.5/5 stars and says Nautanki Saala! plot seems better-suited for a sitcom episode. Anupama Chopra on Hindustan Times gave it a rating of 2 and a half saying "Nautanki Saala! has all the ingredients of a peppy, amiable comedy but this soufflé doesn't quite rise."

Box office
Nautanki Saala! opened slowly while picked up at evening especially at multiplexes on day one and collected around  nett. The film raked  over its first weekend.

References

External links
 
 

T-Series (company) films
2013 films
2013 romantic comedy-drama films
Films directed by Rohan Sippy
Indian romantic comedy-drama films
Films scored by Mikey McCleary
Indian remakes of French films
2013 comedy films
2013 drama films